Kakasharaf Rural District is a rural district (dehestan) in the Central District of Khorramabad County, Lorestan Province, Iran. At the 2006 census, its population was 4,091, in 799 families.  The rural district has 29 villages.

References 

Rural Districts of Lorestan Province
Khorramabad County